Worcester Rowing Club is a rowing club on the River Severn, based at The Boathouse, Grandstand Road, Pitchcroft, Worcester, Worcestershire, West Midlands and backs on to Worcester Racecourse.

History
The club was founded in 1874 from an amalgamation of several other clubs.

The club won the prestigious Wyfold Challenge Cup at the Henley Regatta in 2000  and has produced several national champions.

Club colours
The club's colours are blades: white with two black bars flanking a red bar; kit: scarlet & black.

Honours

Henley Royal Regatta

Honours

British champions

References

Sport in Worcestershire
Sport in Worcester, England
Rowing clubs in England
Rowing clubs of the River Severn
Worcester, England